The year 1933 in archaeology involved some significant events.

Explorations
 Hull of Henry V of England's flagship Grace Dieu identified in the River Hamble.

Excavations
 Excavations at Et-Tell by Judith Marquet-Krause begin (continue through 1935).
 Excavations at Tell Arpachiyah by Max Mallowan and John Cruikshank Rose of the British School of Archaeology in Iraq.
 Excavations at Tepe Sialk by Roman Ghirshman begin (continue in 1934 and 1937).
 Excavation of mastaba of Senewosret-Ankh at Lisht in Egypt by Metropolitan Museum of Art concludes.
 Excavations at Tintagel Castle by C. A. Ralegh Radford begin (continue through 1938).
 Gordon Vivian begins preservation work at Pueblo Bonito, Chetro Ket and Casa Rinconada (through 1937).

Finds
 August 9 - Hoard of silver denarii and a fragment of tartan cloth found at Falkirk, Scotland.
 Ancient city of Mari, Syria.
 Rock art at Tassili n'Ajjer.
 Submerged site of Heracleion in Egypt is identified from the air.

Publications
 Stuart Piggott and Grahame Clark - "The age of the British flint mines", Antiquity.

Births
 May 11 - Anna Marguerite McCann, American underwater archaeologist (d. 2017)
 June 9 - Jerzy Kolendo, Polish archaeologist (d. 2014)
 August 10 - Denise Schmandt-Besserat, French-born archaeologist specialising in the origins of writing and information management
 November 5 – Sonia Elizabeth Chadwick, British early mediaeval archaeologist (d. 1999)
 Don Brothwell, British archaeologist (d. 2016)
 Christos G. Doumas, Greek archaeologist
 Robert Sténuit, Belgian underwater archaeologist

Deaths
 February 4 - Archibald Sayce, English Assyriologist (b. 1845)
 July 13 - Mary Brodrick, English Egyptologist (b. c.1858)

References

Archaeology
Archaeology
Archaeology by year